Murdoch railway station is a railway and bus station on the Transperth network. It is located on the Mandurah line,  from Perth station inside the median strip of the Kwinana Freeway serving the suburb of Murdoch.

History

Murdoch railway station was designed to subsume the existing Murdoch Park 'n' Ride bus station located on the same site. The Park 'n' Ride was closed on 31 January 2007 to facilitate construction of the railway station.

The contract for the construction of Murdoch railway station, along with Bull Creek railway station and Canning Bridge railway station, was awarded to John Holland Pty Ltd in November 2004. This contract was the first contract awarded for the construction of stations on the Southern Suburbs Railway project, and it had a value of $32 million.

During planning, the station was projected to have 4,980 boardings per day upon opening. 

Murdoch Station opened along with the rest of the Mandurah line on 23 December 2007. Murdoch is currently the busiest station utilised on the line with extremely high patronage.

Services
Murdoch Station is served by Transperth Mandurah line services.

Platforms

Transfers
Bus transfers are available on the concourse level. The bus station is situated on a bridge structure extending over the Kwinana Freeway and railway station. Traffic signals at both ends of the bridge include a bus phase.

Bus routes

Stands 1–6

Stands 7–12

References

External links

Station map New MetroRail

Mandurah line
Railway stations in Perth, Western Australia
Railway stations in Australia opened in 2007
Transperth railway stations in highway medians
Bus stations in Perth, Western Australia
Murdoch, Western Australia